Sadio Doumbia and Fabien Reboul were the defending champions but lost in the quarterfinals to Victor Vlad Cornea and Fabian Fallert.

Cornea and Fallert won the title after defeating Jonáš Forejtek and Jelle Sels 6–4, 6–7(6–8), [10–7] in the final.

Seeds

Draw

References

External links
 Main draw

Città di Forlì III - Doubles